West Jordan City Center station is a light rail station in the West Jordan, Utah, United States, served by the Red Line of the Utah Transit Authority's (UTA) TRAX light rail system. The Red Line provides service from the University of Utah to the Daybreak community of South Jordan.

Description 
The station is located at 8021 South Redwood Road (1700 West/SR-68) and is accessible from 7800 South (SR-48) by heading south on Redwood Road. There is not access to the station except directly from Redwood Road. The West Jordan city hall, West Jordan courthouse, West Jordan Branch of the Salt Lake County Library, a Jordan School District administration building, and a small commercial area are to the north of the tracks near the station. The area south of the station is mostly residential and, although the station runs along the north side of 8045 South, there is not direct vehicle or pedestrian access to that road. The station has a Park and Ride with about free 220 parking spaces available, but there are plans for a total of about 600 parking spaces. In the early planning stages, the station was referred to as "Redwood Road", but later changed to the current name, possibly to avoid confusion with Redwood Junction station on the Green Line further north. The station opened August 7, 2011 as part of the Red Line (Mid-Jordan) and is operated by the Utah Transit Authority.

References 

TRAX (light rail) stations
Railway stations in the United States opened in 2011
Railway stations in Salt Lake County, Utah
2011 establishments in Utah